Nawratil is a surname of Czech origin. A spelling variant of Navrátil, it is found mainly in Austria, Germany, and Poland. Notable people with the surname include:

 Grażyna Pstrokońska-Nawratil (born 1947), Polish composer
 Heinz Nawratil (1937–2015), German lawyer

See also
 

Surnames of Czech origin